The Bombay Army was the army of the Bombay Presidency, one of the three presidencies of British India.

It was established in 1662 and governed by the East India Company until the Government of India Act 1858 transferred all presidencies to the direct authority of the British Crown. On 1 April 1895 the army was incorporated into the newly created Indian Army, and became known as the Bombay Command until 1908.

History

18th century

In the early stages of HEIC rule Bombay was rated as an unhealthy and unprofitable region. Accordingly, only a small garrison was maintained while emphasis was placed on creating a local navy (the "Bombay Marine") to control piracy. In 1742 the Bombay Army consisted of eight companies of European and Eurasian garrison troops, numbering 1,593 of all ranks. These had evolved from independent companies dating back as far as 1668 when the Company took over control of the city of Bombay.

The Mahars served in both Bombay Army and Marine battalions. Prior to the Indian Rebellion of 1857 they were heavily recruited and constituted between a fifth and a quarter of the entire Bombay Army.

By 1783 the Bombay Army had grown to 15,000 men, a force that was still significantly smaller than the other two Presidency armies. Recruitment from the 1750s on had however been expanded to include a majority of indigenous sepoys, initially employed as irregulars for particular campaigns. The first two regular sepoy battalions were raised in 1768, a third in 1760 and a fourth ten years later. The non-Indian (mostly British but also including Swiss and German mercenaries) element was organized in a single Bombay European Regiment.

In 1796 the Bombay Native Infantry was reorganized into four regiments, each of two battalions. The Bombay Foot Artillery, which traced its history back nearly 50 years prior to this date, was brought up to six companies in strength in 1797.

The Bombay Army was heavily involved in the First Maratha War and the defeat of Tipu Sultan of Mysore in 1799.

19th century

Prior to the cessation of Company rule in 1861, the Bombay Army played a substantial role in campaigns against the Bani Bu Ali in 1821, in North-Western India, notably the 1st Afghan War of 1838–1842, the Sind War of 1843, the 2nd Sikh War of 1848–49 and the Persian War of 1856-57. The Bombay Army had acquired responsibility for garrisoning Aden, and The 1st Bombay European Regiment, The Bombay Marine Battalion and the 24th Bombay Native Infantry all saw service there in 1839.

As of 1 January 1842 the Bombay Army's disposition was as follows:
The Bombay Garrison
The Poona Division – Headquartered in Poona
The Northern Division – Headquartered in Ahmedabad
The Mhow Brigade
The Scinde Field Force
Forces in Lower Scinde
Forces Garrisoning the Asirgarh Fort
Forces in and around Karrack Island (Kharg Island), in the Persian Gulf
Forces in Aden.

The Bombay native infantry establishment continued to expand until it reached 26 regiments in 1845. Three Bombay Light Cavalry regiments were raised after 1817, plus a few troops of irregular horse. One brigade of Bombay Horse Artillery comprising both British and Indian personnel had been established by 1845, plus three battalions of foot artillery.

The Indian Rebellion of 1857 was almost entirely confined to the Bengal Army. Of the thirty-two Bombay infantry regiments in existence at the time only two mutinied. After some initial uncertainty as to the loyalty of the remainder, it was deemed possible to send most of the British troops in the Presidency to Bengal, while the Bombay sepoy and sowar (cavalry) units held the southern districts of the North-West Frontier. Some Bombay units saw active service during the repression of the rebellion in Central India.

The Bombay Presidency's Army was also supplemented by regular British Army Regiments and in 1842 one cavalry and four infantry regiments were deployed on the "Bombay Establishment".

Post mutiny
Following the transfer of HEIC rule to that of the British government in 1861 the Bombay Army underwent a series of changes. These included the disbandment of three regiments of Bombay Native Infantry and the recruitment of replacement units from the Beluchi population. Originally created as irregular units, the three "Belooch" regiments in their red trousers were to remain a conspicuous part of the Bombay Army for the remainder of its separate existence.

By 1864 the Bombay Army had been reorganised as follows:

The Northern Division
The Poona Division
The Mhow Division
The Scinde Division

With brigades at Bombay, Belgaum, Neemuch, Poona, Ahmednuggur, Nusseerabad and Deesa; as well as a garrison in Aden. During the remainder of the 19th century Bombay Army units participated in the 1868 Expedition to Abyssinia, the Second Afghan War of 1878–80, and the Third Anglo-Burmese War of 1885–87.

In 1895 the three separate Presidency Armies were abolished and the Army of India was divided into four commands, each commanded by a lieutenant-general. These comprised Madras (including Burma), Punjab (including the North West Frontier), Bengal and Bombay (including Aden).

End of the separate Bombay Army
In 1895 the three separate Presidency Armies began a process of unification which was not to be concluded until the Kitchener reforms of eight years later.
As an initial step the Army of India was divided into four commands, each commanded by a lieutenant-general. These comprised Bombay (including Aden), Madras (including Burma), Punjab (including the North West Frontier) and Bengal. In 1903 the separately numbered regiments of the Bombay, Madras and Bengal Armies were unified in a single organisational sequence and the presidency affiliations disappeared.

Composition

Bombay Army units. In 1864 the following were recorded as being on the Bombay Army's order of battle (locations at that time are shown):

Bombay Artillery – HQ Kirkee

1st Battalion (formed 1769)
1st Company (raised as the Bengal Company of Artillery) raised 1748, re-designated as 1st Bty, 18th Bde, RA 19 February 1862
2nd Company (raised as 3rd Co) raised 1755, disbanded 1759, reformed 1765, re-designated as 2nd Bty, 18th Bde, RA 19 February 1862
3rd Company (raised as 5th Co) raised 1796, re-designated as 3rd Bty, 18th Bde, RA 19 February 1862
4th Company (raised as 7th Co) raised 1796, re-designated as 4th Bty, 18th Bde, RA 19 February 1862
5th Company (raised as 9th Co) raised 1819, disbanded 1 May 1824
2nd Battalion (formed 1820)
1st Company (raised as 2nd Co) raised 1755, re-designated as 1st Bty, 21st Bde, RA 19 February 1862
2nd Company (raised as 4th Co) raised 1768, re-designated as 2nd Bty, 21st Bde, RA 19 February 1862
3rd Company (raised as 6th Co) raised 1797, re-designated as 3rd Bty, 21st Bde, RA 19 February 1862
4th Company (raised as 8th Co) raised 1819, part of 5th and 4th Indian Fld Btys from 1849 to 1862 when transferred as 4th Bty, 21st Bde, RA 19 February 1862
5th Company (raised as 10th Co) raised 1819, disbanded 1824
3rd (Reserve) Battalion, dropped 'Reserve' in 1861 (formed 1857)
1st Company raised 1857, re-designated as 5th Bty, 18th Bde, RA 19 February 1862
2nd Company raised 1857, re-designated as 6th Bty, 18th Bde, RA 19 February 1862
3rd Company raised 1857, re-designated as 5th Bty 21st Bde, RA 19 February 1862
4th Company raised 1857, re-designated as 6th Bty 21st Bde, RA 19 February 1862

Corps of Royal Engineers – HQ Poona

Corps of Sappers and Miners – HQ Poona:
1st Company – Mhow
2nd Company – Carwar
3rd Company – Carwar
4th Company – Aden
5th Company – Aden.

Native Cavalry
1st Light Cavalry (Lancers) – Deesa
2nd Light Cavalry – Neemuch
3rd Light Cavalry – Poona
Poona Horse – Seroor
1st Regiment Scinde Horse – Jacobabad
2nd Regiment Scinde Horse – Jacobabad
3rd Regiment Scinde Horse – Jacobabad
Southern Mahratta Horse – Kulladghee

Native Infantry
1st or Grenadier Native Infantry Regiment – Aden
2nd or Grenadier Native Infantry Regiment – Belgaum
3rd Native Infantry Regiment – Malligaum
4th Native Infantry Regiment (Rifle Corps) – Bombay
5th Light Infantry – Belgaum
6th Native Infantry – Mhow
7th Native Infantry – Poona
8th Native Infantry – Neemuch
9th Native Infantry – Dhoolia
10th Native Infantry – Poona
11th Native Infantry – Deesa
12th Native Infantry – Surat
13th Native Infantry – Ahmedabad
14th Native Infantry – Ahmedabad
15th Native Infantry – Mhow
16th Native Infantry – Rajkota
17th Native Infantry – Nusseerabad
18th Native Infantry – Bhooj
19th Native Infantry – Baroda
20th Native Infantry – Ahmedabad
21st Native Infantry or Marine Battalion – Bombay
22nd Native Infantry – China
23rd Native Infantry – Kurrachee
24th Native Infantry – Dharwar
25th Native Infantry – Bholapore
26th Native Infantry – Kolapore
27th Native Infantry or 1st Belooch Regiment – Hyderabad
28th Native Infantry – Mehdipore
29th Native Infantry or 2nd Belooch Regiment – China
30th Native Infantry or Jacob's Rifles – Jacobabad

Irregular, Police, Medical, Ordnance and Commissariat units are not listed separately.

The three European infantry regiments had been absorbed into the British Army as line infantry units.

Prestigious units of the Bombay Army include the 1st Bombay Grenadiers (now called The Grenadiers) raised in 1784 from grenadier companies of existing regiments, and the Maratha Light Infantry.

Commanders in Chief
Commanders-in-Chief included:
Commander-in-Chief, Bombay Army
 Brigadier-General Lawrence Nilson (1785–1788)
 Major-General William Medows (1788–1790)
 Major-General Robert Abercromby (1790–1793)
Major-General James Balfour Commanding (1794–1797)
 Major-General James Stuart (1797–1800)
 Major-General Robert Nicholson Commanding (1800–1801)
 Major-General Richard Bowles Commanding (1800)
 Major-General Oliver Nicolls (1801–1808)
 Major-General John Belasis Commanding 
 Major-General Richard Jones Commanding 
 Lieutenant-General John Abercromby (1809–1813)
 Major-General W. Wilkinson Commanding (1813–1815)
 Major-General Charles Boye Commanding (1815–1816)
 Lieutenant-General Sir Miles Nightingall (1816–1819)
 Lieutenant-General Sir Charles Colville (1819–1826)
 Major-General Samuel Wilson Commanding (1826)
 Lieutenant-General Sir Thomas Bradford (1826–1829)
 Lieutenant-General Sir Thomas Beckwith (1829–1832)
 Lieutenant-General Sir Colin Halkett (1832–1834)
 Lieutenant-General Sir John Keane (1834–1838)
 Major-General J. F. Fitzgerald (1838–1840)
 Lieutenant-General Sir Thomas McMahon (1840–1847)
 Lieutenant-General Sir Willoughby Cotton (1847–1850)
 Lieutenant-General Sir John Grey (1850–1852)
 Lieutenant-General Lord Frederick FitzClarence (1852–1854)
 Lieutenant-General Sir Henry Somerset (1855–1860)
 Lieutenant-General Sir Hugh Rose (1860)
 Lieutenant-General Sir William Mansfield (1860–1865)
 Lieutenant-General Sir Robert Napier (1865–1869)
 Lieutenant-General Sir Augustus Spencer (1869–1874)
 Lieutenant-General Sir Charles Staveley (1874–1878)
 Lieutenant-General Sir Henry Warre (1878–1881)
 Lieutenant-General Sir Arthur Hardinge (1881–1886)
 Lieutenant-General Sir Charles Arbuthnot (1886)
 Lieutenant-General The Duke of Connaught (1886–1890)
 Lieutenant-General Sir George Greaves (1890–1893)
 Lieutenant-General Sir John Hudson (1893)
 Lieutenant-General Sir Charles Nairne (1893–1895)
Commander-in-Chief, Bombay Command
 Lieutenant-General Sir Charles Nairne (1895–1898)
 Lieutenant-General Sir Robert Low (1898–1903)
 Lieutenant-General Sir Archibald Hunter (1903–1907)

See also
 Presidency armies
 Bengal Army
 Madras Army
 The Grenadiers
 Baloch Regiment

References

Sources

 

British East India Company
Military of British India
Military history of the British East India Company
Bombay Presidency